Michael Kiesling (born 1957) is a German board game designer. Many of his games have been nominated for or have won the Spiel des Jahres, a German games award.

He is best known for the 2018 Spiel des Jahres winner Azul and for co-authoring the board game trilogy Tikal, Java and Mexica, and Torres with Wolfgang Kramer.

Notable games
 2017 Azul - Spiel des Jahres Winner
 2017 Heaven and Ale - Kennerspiel des Jahres Nominee
 2014 Abluxxen (with Wolfgang Kramer) - Spiel des Jahres Winner
 2012 The Palaces of Carrara (with Wolfgang Kramer) - Kennerspiel des Jahres Nominee
 2010 Asara (with Wolfgang Kramer) - nominated, Spiel des Jahres
 2010 Tikal II (with Wolfgang Kramer)
 2005 Verflixxt! (with Wolfgang Kramer) - nominated, Spiel des Jahres
 2004 Maharaja: The Game of Palace Building in India  (with Wolfgang Kramer) - Spiel des Jahres Nominee
 2002 Mexica  (with Wolfgang Kramer)
 2000 Java (with Wolfgang Kramer)
 2000 Torres (with Wolfgang Kramer) - winner, Spiel des Jahres; 2nd place, Deutscher Spiele Preis
 1999 Tikal (together with Wolfgang Kramer) - winner, Spiel des Jahres and Deutscher Spiele Preis

External links
 Kramer Co-Autoren 
 

1957 births
Living people
Board game designers